Rafael Cañas (born 5 November 1953) is a Chilean alpine skier. He competed in three events at the 1976 Winter Olympics.

References

1953 births
Living people
Chilean male alpine skiers
Olympic alpine skiers of Chile
Alpine skiers at the 1976 Winter Olympics
Place of birth missing (living people)
20th-century Chilean people